Natipong Sritong-In (Thai เนติพงษ์ ศรีทองอินทร์) or "Alfred" is a Thai former professional footballer who played as a striker. current assistant coach of Thai League 1 club BG Pathum United. He scored 25 goals for the Thailand national team between 1995 and 1997 including at the 1996 AFC Asian Cup finals and 1996 AFF Championship top scorer with 7 goals. In 1997 Natipong retired from international football, turning instead to golf.

International goals

Honours

Clubs
Thai Farmer Bank
 Asian Club Championship: 1994, 1995
 Kor Royal Cup: 1995
 Queen's Cup: 1994, 1995
 Afro-Asian Club Championship: 1994

International
Thailand
 Sea Games: 1995, 1997 
 ASEAN Football Championship: 1996
 King's Cup: 1994

Individual
ASEAN Football Championship top scorer: 1996
Asian Super Cup top scorer: 1995

References

1972 births
Living people
Association football forwards
Natipong Sritong-In
Natipong Sritong-In
1996 AFC Asian Cup players
Natipong Sritong-In
Natipong Sritong-In
Southeast Asian Games medalists in football
Competitors at the 1995 Southeast Asian Games
Competitors at the 1997 Southeast Asian Games
Thai expatriate sportspeople in France
Natipong Sritong-In
Olympique Noisy-le-Sec players
Natipong Sritong-In
Natipong Sritong-In
Natipong Sritong-In